Saint Thomas Episcopal Church is an Episcopal church located at 1 Smith Avenue (the junction of United States Route 44 and Rhode Island Route 116) in the village of Greenville in Smithfield, Rhode Island.

History
The present church, a handsome Gothic Revival stone structure, was designed by a prominent local architect, Thomas Alexander Tefft, and built in 1851 on land donated to the new congregation by Resolved Waterman, a Greenville native and prominent businessman.  The congregation was established as an offshoot of St. Stephen's Church in Providence, which was attended by Waterman and whose officiant, Rev. James Eames, was Saint Thomas' first minister.  It is one of a small number of surviving designs by Tefft, who designed as many as 25 Rhode Island churches in his career.  The rectory, a modest vernacular Queen Anne structure, was built in 1889.  The property was listed on the National Register of Historic Places in 1987.

The current minister is the Rev. Dante A. Tavolaro .

See also

National Register of Historic Places listings in Providence County, Rhode Island

References

External links
Church web site

Episcopal churches in Rhode Island
Churches on the National Register of Historic Places in Rhode Island
Churches completed in 1851
19th-century Episcopal church buildings
Churches in Providence County, Rhode Island
Buildings and structures in Smithfield, Rhode Island
1851 establishments in Rhode Island
National Register of Historic Places in Providence County, Rhode Island